BV Den Helder, also known as Den Helder Suns, is a Dutch women's basketball club based in Den Helder. Established in 1983, it plays in the Women's Basketball League (WBL). The club has won sixteen national championships.

History
The club was founded in 1983. Before, there was a team as part of BV Noordkop, however the ladies team decided to establish a separate club to further its ambitions. Since then, the team has played in the Dames Eredivisie.

Since the 2021–22 season, the team plays as Den Helder Suns, adopting the same name as the men's professional team from Den Helder. The organisations stayed separated from each other.

Honours
Women's Basketball League
Champions (16): 1985, 1988–1991, 1996, 1998–2000, 2004–2006, 2008, 2009, 2021, 2022
NBB Cup
Champions (7): 1992, 1993, 1997, 1998, 1999, 2007, 2020
WBL Final Four
Champions (7): 1995, 1996, 1998, 1999, 2001, 2004, 2008

Players

Current roster

Notable players

References

BV Den Helder
Basketball teams established in 1983
Women's basketball teams in the Netherlands